The Stadion Woudestein  (known as the Van Donge & De Roo Stadion for sponsorship reasons), is a multi-use stadium in Rotterdam, Netherlands. It is currently used mainly for football matches and is the home stadium of Excelsior, as well as for the women's team Excelsior Barendrecht. The stadium is able to hold 4,500 people and was built in 1902. It remains one of the smallest stadiums in the Netherlands, tenanted by a professional club. The stadium has a stand named after Robin van Persie, who played was part of the Excelsior youth academy between 1997 and 1999.

References

Football venues in the Netherlands
Sports venues in Rotterdam
Excelsior Rotterdam
Sports venues completed in 1902